Nicrophorus obscurus is a burying beetle described by William Kirby in 1837.

References

Silphidae
Beetles of North America
Taxa named by William Kirby (entomologist)
Beetles described in 1837